The St. Stephen Chrysobull or Banjska Chrysobull (Бањска хрисовуља/Banjska hrisovulja) was a chrysobull, charter, issued in 1314–1316 by Serbian king Stefan Milutin (r. 1282–1321). It was held at the Banjska monastery founded by Milutin. It is currently held at the Topkapi library in Istanbul.

The transcript of this charter in the form of a book was found in 1889 in Old Saraj, Constantinople, whose text was printed in two editions in Belgrade and in Vienna. Serbian King Stefan Uroš II Milutin raised an endowment between 1313 and 1316 as a grave church in the region of Kosovska Mitrovica in Banjska, dedicated to St. Stefan the First Martyr. Upon completion of construction he issued the charter in the form of a rotulus with a gold seal at its end, which was soon written on parchment in the form of a book, because of its wider and better usability. The book next to the text of the charter which ends with the signature of King Milutin, also contains the exposures of King Dragutin and Archbishop Nikodim I. 

The Chrysobull describeds in detail the expansion of estates which King Milutin gifted to the settlements of Ibar, Sitnica, Laba, in Ras, Hvosna, Plava, Budim, Zeta, and others. It also includes a special section by the name of "Law of Vlachs" which covers the regulations of Vlach cattle breeder obligations on that manor. Obligations and privileges of farmers, cattle breeders and craftsman are prescribed in the charter according to Banjska Monastery. After the Battle of Kosovo in 1389 the Osmans pillaged Milutin’s endowment and took the charter in the process, which has been kept in Constantinople since the second half of the 15th century, in the sultan's treasury of Old Saraj.

Finding and publication of St. Stefan’s Chrysobull 
The merit for the finding of St. Stefan’s Chrysobull goes to the Hungarian philologist Armin Vambery. He was a great connoisseur of Turkish language and history, a traveler through Central Asia and the Ottoman Empire and the author of many Turkish dictionaries. Thanks to that he was granted permission to study documents that were moved from Budim to Constantinople several centuries ago. Čedomilj Mijatović and Stojan Novaković found out about that. Stojan Novaković met with the Polish scholar Korzhenovsky who was a member of the expedition that inspected the documents. Korzhenovsky informed Novaković that he found "one Serbian diploma, in the form of a book, issued by two kings, Stefan and Stefan Uroš, that was granted to some monastery". Stojan Novaković immediately assumed that it was St. Stefan’s Chrysobull. Soon after that Novaković met with Vambery and it was agreed that Korzhenovsky would photograph the charter and give it to Hungarian Royal Academy which would later give it to the Serbian Royal Academy. 

In 1889 Novaković compiled a report about the finding of the Chrysobull, but renounced the honour of printing it. He left the honour to Ljubomir Kovačević who published it in February 1890. Soon after that Vatroslav Jagić wrote about the charter, describing how it was found, and published it himself at a later date. A quote of Nikola Radojčić, made on the occasion of publication of Stefan Lazarević’s Mining Law, gives enough information about the importance of St. Stefan’s Chrysobull: "The Serbian historical science has not received a greater and more useful surprise since the finding of St. Stefan’s Chrysobull, until the discovery of this Mining Law by Despot Stefan Lazarević. Let us hope that this is not the last great discovery." The finding of St. Stefans Chrysobull and the discovery of Stefan Lazarević’s Mining Law remain important historical discoveries to this day. This is the oldest Chrysobull written in the form of a book.

Year of issuance of the charter 
The time in which Stefan Milutin issued the charter is connected to the time of the construction of St. Stefan’s monastery in Banjska. The question of the charter's publication started soon after it became known to science. The first to engage with it was Stojan Novaković who dated the construction of St. Stefan’s monastery to the period between 1312 and 1317. The charter had to be issued after the construction of the monastery. The construction of the monastery started after the civil war between Milutin and Dragutin, and was finished soon after the death of Queen Jelena, but before the death of King Dragutin. Archbishop Danilo mentions a meeting of the brothers in Pauni at which mutual issues were regulated. Many historians believe that it was that assembly on which St. Stefan’s charter, which contains both Kings' signatures, was passed. However, the exact year of the meeting is not known. 

 The brothers' meeting was preceded by a meeting between the Serbian Queens Simonida and Katalina which probably occurred in the middle of 1314. The meeting of the brothers came after this, and also after the rebellion and blinding of Stefan Dečanski, son of Milutin. It is certainly known that the charter was issued in the time span between the death of Queen Jelena and Dragutin, thus between 8 February 1314 and 12 March 1316. Whether St. Stefan’s charter passed at an assembly is unclear: the detail is not mentioned either in the charter itself, or in the "Lives of the Kings and Archbishops of Serbia". The charter was not confirmed by the Archbishop Sava, during whose time it was enacted. Instead, it was confirmed after Dragutin's death on 12 May 1317, in the time of Archbishop Nikodim.

The appearance of the charter 
St. Stefan’s Chrysobull had been preserved in its original form—a parchment codex measuring 230 × 290 mm—but was trimmed down to 210 × 270 mm during the late 19th-century, when it was rebound in the red leather currently enclosing it. The inner boards of the original binding included three spaces for seals; in the past the seals of Milutin and Dragutin were attached to it. The charter contains 180 pages with 2131 rows. Copied in Uncial script, in brown ink, with twelve lines per page, the manuscript boasts initials in red cinnabar, as well as signatures in red cinnabar (Milutin and Dragutin) and in blue ink (archbishop Nikodim). It is skilfully illuminated in colours and gold. According to A. Turilov, the entire main text, with the exception of ff. 27 and 28, was copied by Radoslav (Georgije), the scribe who also copied Milutin's 1315–1316 Hilandar Gospel Book; one of the codex's last pages features added 15th-century notes by Stefan Crnojević. The saved Chrysobull represents one of the manuscripts created upon acknowledgement in 1317. Stefan Crnojević clarified in a note that he bolded/thickened the faded signature of Archbishop Nikodim. 

In the text the document is named St. Stefan’s Chrysobull or the Banjska charter. In lieu of a verbal invocation (which was common for charters of that time) the charter opens with a symbolic invocation. The extensive arenga (explanatory preamble) includes a dedication to St. Stefan. In the intitulation, Milutin's title and ancestors are listed. From the exposure we can see that there was already a church at the place of the monasteries construction which the Serbian King found in ruin. In the disposition of medieval Serbian charters, as the most important part of the document, are enumerated goods which the founder attached to the monastery. The same applies to this charter. 

The St. Stefan’s Chrysobull is significant because it regulates obligations of the dependent population on monastic property. This part of the disposition is known by the name of "the law to the people of the church" or "Vlach law". The sanctions include a penalty for violators of the royal commandments and charter. 

The exact date of the issuing of the charter is not known because, unusually, it does not include a dating clause. This is the only charter containing the confirmations of two Serbian Kings. Milutin's signature in the Chrysobull reads: "Stefan, by the mercy of God, King and Autocrat of all Serbian and seaside lands".

Annotations

References

Sources

Further reading

Nemanjić dynasty
Serbian manuscripts
History of the Serbian Orthodox Church
1310s works
Medieval charters and cartularies of Serbia
14th-century establishments in Serbia
14th-century documents
Cyrillic manuscripts